Olof Philip Oxehufvud (25 August 1797 – 22 March 1857), was a Swedish jurist and hovjunkare.

Life and work 
Olof Philip Oxehufvud was born into the Oxehufvud family. He was the first of seven children to Bo Oxehufvud and Christina Bonde.

Oxehufvud served as chief district judge in Sundbo, Grimsten, Kumla, Hardemo, Edsberg and Lekeberg. In the 1840s, he acquired the Björkborn Ironworks, the progenitor of Bofors.

In 1852, he was appointed Knight of the Order of the Polar Star.

Oxehufvud married Chrstina "Kitty" Melin in 1830. He died on 22 March 1857 at Björkborn Manor.

References 

1797 births
1857 deaths
19th-century Swedish landowners
Swedish nobility
Knights of the Order of the Polar Star
Lund University alumni
Swedish landowners
Swedish ironmasters
Olof Philip
Burials at Karlskoga Old Cemetery